The 2010 Women's Six Nations Championship, also known as the 2010 RBS Women's 6 Nations due to the tournament's sponsorship by the Royal Bank of Scotland, was the ninth series of the Women's Six Nations Championship, an annual women's rugby union competition between six European rugby union national teams. The tournament was held between 5 February and 21 March 2010; the same weekends as the men's tournament was being played.

The championship was contested by England, France, Ireland, Italy, Scotland and Wales. England won the tournament, achieving a final 11–10 victory over France to win the Grand Slam, and their fifth title in a row.

Final table

Fixtures and results
On early December 2009 it was announced the fixtures scheduled for 2010 Championship. Three teams played all their home games at the same venue: Pillar Data Arena (England), Milltown House (Ireland) and Brewery Field (Wales).

Week 1

Week 2

Week 3

Week 4

Week 5

Leading scorers

Point scorers

Other point scorers
10 points: Margareth Alphonsi (England), Rochelle Clark (England), Fanny Horta (France), Caryl James (Wales), Stéphanie Loyer (France), Lucy  Millard (Scotland), Amber Penrith (England), Sandra Rabier (France), Veronica Schiavon (Italy), Flavia Severin (Italy), Catherine  Spencer (England), Amy Turner (England)
6 points: Sarah Gill (Scotland)
5 points: Claire Allan (England), Rebecca Essex (England), Mared Evans (Wales), Manuela Furlan (Italy), Tanya Griffith (Scotland), Marie-Charlotte Hebel (France), Caroline Ladagnous (France), Jo McGilchrist (England), Katherine  Merchant (England), Alison Miller (Ireland), Kate O'Loughlin (Ireland), Silvia  Peron (Italy), Lynne Reid (Scotland), Tanya Rosser (Ireland), Sinead Ryan (Ireland), Michella Staniford (England), Nora Stapleton (Ireland), Licia Stefan (Italy), Naomi Thomas (Wales), Maria Diletta Veronese (Italy)
4 points: Alice Richardson (England), Michela Tondinelli (Italy)
3 points: Nicola Halfpenny (Scotland), Christelle Le Duff (France), Arwen Thomas (Wales)
2 points: Louise Dalgliesh (Scotland)

See also
Women's Six Nations Championship
Women's international rugby

References

External links
The official RBS Six Nations Site
 Announcement of tournament dates and venues

2010
2010 rugby union tournaments for national teams
2009–10 in Irish rugby union
2009–10 in English rugby union
2009–10 in Welsh rugby union
2009–10 in Scottish rugby union
2009–10 in French rugby union
2009–10 in Italian rugby union
2009–10 in European women's rugby union
rugby union
rugby union
rugby union
rugby union
February 2010 sports events in Europe
March 2010 sports events in Europe
Women
rugby union
rugby union